This is a list of fellows of the Royal Society elected in 1703.

Fellows
 Robert Areskin (c. 1674–1719)
 Peniston Booth (1681–1785)
 Claude Bourdelin (1667–1711)
 Johann Philipp Breyne (c. 1680–1764)
 William Derham (1657–1735)
 Sir Matthew Dudley, 2nd Baronet (1661–1721)
 John Hickes (fl. 1703–1717)
 James Hodgson (1672–1755)
 Pieter Hotton (1648–1709)
 Richard Mead (1673–1754)
 Joseph Morland (c. 1671–1716)
 John Morton (c. 1670–1726)
 William Oliver (1659–1716)
 August Quirinus Rivinus (1652–1723)
 Russell Robartes (c. 1672–1724)
 Johann Jakob Scheuchzer (1672–1733)
 Joseph Shaw (1671–1733)
 Philip Stubs (1665–1738)
 Emanuele Timone (1665–1741)
 Antonio Valisnieri (1661–1730)

References

1703
1703 in science
1703 in England